Adelfa Calvo Soto (born 5 April 1962) is a Spanish actress.

Biography 
Born on 5 April 1962 in Melilla, Adelfa Calvo Soto moved when she was barely months old  to Málaga, where she was largely raised, together with Seville. She is the daughter of cantaora Adelfa Soto and the grand daughter of La Niña de la Puebla.

She won the Goya Award for Best Supporting Actress for her performance in The Motive.

Accolades

References

External links 
 

1962 births
Spanish film actresses
Spanish television actresses
Living people
Best Supporting Actress Goya Award winners
21st-century Spanish actresses